Erika Mitchell (born 7 March 1963), known by her pen name E. L. James, is a British author. She wrote the best-selling erotic romance trilogy Fifty Shades of Grey, Fifty Shades Darker, and Fifty Shades Freed, along with the companion novels Grey: Fifty Shades of Grey as Told by Christian, Darker: Fifty Shades Darker as Told by Christian, and Freed: Fifty Shades Freed as Told by Christian. Prior to this, she wrote the Twilight fan fiction "Master of the Universe" that served as the basis for the Fifty Shades trilogy under the web name Snowqueens Icedragon. In 2019 she published her first book unconnected with the fictional world of Fifty Shades, The Mister, to negative critical reaction.

The Fifty Shades novels have sold over 125 million copies worldwide, over 35 million copies in the United States and set the record in the United Kingdom as the fastest selling paperback of all time. In 2012, Time magazine named her one of "The World's 100 Most Influential People". The novels were subsequently adapted into the films Fifty Shades of Grey, Fifty Shades Darker, and Fifty Shades Freed.

Early life
Erika Mitchell was born on 7 March 1963 in Willesden, Middlesex to a Chilean mother and a Scottish father who was a BBC cameraman. She was brought up in Buckinghamshire.

James was educated at the independent Pipers Corner School and at Wycombe High School, a state grammar school for girls in the town of High Wycombe in Buckinghamshire, followed by the University of Kent in South East England where she studied History.

After leaving university, James became a studio manager's assistant at the National Film and Television School in Beaconsfield. She married Niall Leonard, a novelist and screenwriter from Northern Ireland, in 1987. They have two sons. As of 2012, they reside in Brentford, West London.

Career

James says the idea for the Fifty Shades trilogy began as a response to the vampire novel series Twilight. In late 2008, James saw the movie Twilight, and then became intensely absorbed with the novels that the movie was based on. She read the novels several times over in a period of a few days, and then, for the first time in her life, sat down to write a book: basically a sequel to the Twilight novels. Between January and August 2009, she wrote two such books in quick succession. She says she then discovered the phenomenon of fan fiction, and this inspired her to publish her novels as Kindle books under the pen name "Snowqueens Icedragon". Beginning in August 2009, she then began to write the Fifty Shades books.

James has spoken of her shock at the success of the books. "The explosion of interest has taken me completely by surprise" she said. James has described the Fifty Shades trilogy as "my midlife crisis, writ large. All my fantasies in there, and that's it." She did not start to write until January 2009, as she revealed while still active on FanFiction.Net: "I started writing in January 2009 after I finished the Twilight saga, and I haven't stopped since. I discovered Fan Fiction in August 2009. Since then I have written my two fics and plan on doing at least one more. After that ... who knows?" In August 2013, James topped the Forbes list of the highest-earning authors due to her book sales with earnings of $95m which included $5m for the film rights to Fifty Shades of Grey. On 1 June 2015 James announced the upcoming release of Grey: Fifty Shades of Grey as Told by Christian, which was released into stores on 18 June 2015. Darker: Fifty Shades Darker as Told by Christian was released 28 November 2017.

Awards and honours
2012 Time 100 by Time magazine, "The 100 Most Influential People in the World"
2012 Publishers Weekly "Publishing Person of the Year".
2012 National Book Award (UK), "Popular Fiction Book of the Year", Fifty Shades of Grey 
2012 National Book Award (UK), "Book of the Year", Fifty Shades of Grey

Bibliography
Fifty Shades of Grey (2011)
Fifty Shades Darker (2012)
Fifty Shades Freed (2012)
Grey: Fifty Shades of Grey as Told by Christian (2015)
Darker: Fifty Shades Darker as Told by Christian (2017)
The Mister (2019)
Freed: Fifty Shades Freed as Told by Christian (2021)

Filmography

References

External links

 
 

Living people
English erotica writers
English people of Chilean descent
English people of Scottish descent
Fan fiction writers
1963 births
People educated at Wycombe High School
Pseudonymous women writers
Alumni of the University of Kent
English romantic fiction writers
21st-century English women writers
21st-century English novelists
People from Buckinghamshire
Women erotica writers
Women romantic fiction writers
BDSM writers
21st-century pseudonymous writers